Basset Griffon Vendéen may refer to:
Grand Basset Griffon Vendéen (FCI #33), a small French dog
Petit Basset Griffon Vendéen (FCI #67), a smaller French dog